Events in the year 1665 in Norway.

Incumbents
Monarch: Frederick III

Events

2 August – The Battle of Vågen, Bergen, a naval battle between an English flotilla of warships and a Dutch merchant and treasure fleet, as part of the Second Anglo-Dutch War.
14 November – The King's Law or Lex Regia (Danish and Norwegian: Kongeloven) was introduced.
The city of Halden is founded (as Frederikshald).

Arts and literature

The construction of Rosendal Manor was finished.

Births

5 December – Iver Huitfeldt, military officer (d.1710).

Deaths

See also

References